Viachaslau Shumak (born 22 December 1988) is a Belarusian handball player for HC Meshkov Brest and the Belarusian national team.

References

External links

1988 births
Living people
Belarusian male handball players
Sportspeople from Brest, Belarus